The Get Out and Push Railroad (formally, the Wilmington & Long Beach Rapid Transit Railroad) was a 19th-century street railway, connecting Wilmington, California, to the Willmore area of Long Beach, California, which requested its patrons to assist trains over the steeper parts of the route.

Origins
The line was built by Robert M. Widney to convey potential buyers to a new tract of land which he and W.E. Willmore were developing, at first called Willmore City but later renamed Long Beach. Originally a horse-drawn car, on the first day of service (October 31, 1882) the vehicle broke its wooden rails, forcing the men passengers to push it to a sound section of track, after which the line was popularly known as the G.O.P. ("Get Out and Push") Railroad. In 1883 floods washed the line out twice.

Few lots were sold, and in 1884 the land scheme was abandoned. Instead, an extensive advertising campaign was undertaken promoting Long Beach as a summertime resort, and the line was extended to the newly built five-story Bay View Hotel, located just south of what is now Lincoln Park.

Conversion to steam
In 1885 a route was surveyed for a steam railway which would replace (and roughly follow the route of) the horsecar line. On initial test runs, however, the small steam engine was unable to move the car coupled to it until (as reported by the Los Angeles Herald) "a man boosted them with a pinch bar. When the railroad is completed, some of the citizens suggest that the horse rail-way be continued in operation for the benefit of those who may be in a hurry."

The steam line was completed in 1886 and eventually renamed the Wilmington& Long Beach Rapid Transit Railroad. But it inherited its predecessor's "Get Out and Push" nickname  because (in the words of Walter H. Case)

The Los Angeles Times published a song to the tune of "Paddy Duffey's Cart":

In 1887 the line was taken over by the Southern Pacific Railroad.

References

Transportation in Long Beach, California
Defunct California railroads
Railway companies established in 1882
Railway companies disestablished in 1887
1882 establishments in California
1887 disestablishments in California